Nivi is a Greenlandic Inuit feminine given name meaning “girl.” It has been a popular name for girls in Greenland in recent years. Another popular variant of the name is Niviaq.

Notes 

Feminine given names